Pharae was an ancient city in Crete, Greece. The city was founded by the city of Pharae in Messenia and named for it.

References

Cities in ancient Greece
Lost ancient cities and towns
Populated places in ancient Crete
Former populated places in Greece
Ancient Greek cities